Mike Alvarado (born July 28, 1980) is an American professional boxer who held the WBO light welterweight title in 2013.

Early life
Alvarado was born in Denver, Colorado. He is the cousin of featherweight prospect Ricky López and his biological father was 17-0 boxing prospect Ron Cisneros who, when Alvarado was young, separated from his mother.

Amateur career
Alvarado was a two time Colorado Class 4A state high school wrestling champion at Skyview High School. Alvarado decided not to wrestle in college and instead selected a boxing career. In a span of about three years, Alvarado compiled a record of 36–5. Among his defeated opponents were Chad Aquino and eventual 2004 Athens Olympian Andre Dirrell, both of whom he defeated to take the Ringside National Championship in 2001.

Professional career

Alvarado vs. Malignaggi cancellation
Alvarado was going to fight Paulie Malignaggi but he suffered an elbow injury and withdrew from the fight set for June 27, 2009.

He served a 5-month prison sentence and made a return to boxing with a 2nd-round KO of Lenin Arroyo. Alvarado was to fight on Latin Fury 15 but was back in jail for parole violations, he had been on probation for "traffic and driving offenses and another charge." Alvarado then made a successful return to the ring by knocking out the veteran Joshua Burns. Up to this point in his career, Alvarado had beaten fighters such as Carlos Molina, Michael Clark, Michel Rosales, César Bazán, Emmanuel Clottey, and Juaquin Gallardo.

Alvarado beat Ghana's Raymond Narh (25-1), to win the WBC Continental Americas Light Welterweight Championship, which he would later vacate just before his fight with Gabriel Martínez. This bout was on Showtime's televised portion of the Pacquiao vs. Mosley undercard. Alvarado's next victory was against Gabriel Martínez, to win IBF Latino Light Welterweight Championship. The bout took place on July 30, 2011, in Denver, Colorado.

Alvarado vs. Prescott
Alvarado fought Breidis Prescott on November 12, 2011, in Las Vegas, Nevada, on the undercard of Manny Pacquiao vs. Juan Manuel Márquez III. Prescott started out the fight fast, and was able to successfully out-box Alvarado for the first 5 rounds, building a lead on the scorecards. In the middle and late rounds, Alvarado became the main aggressor, and cut the distance, effectively trading shots with Prescott on the inside, and winning the middle and late rounds. By the 10th round, Prescott seemed out of gas and Alvarado took advantage, launching a large offensive attack in the opening minute of the round. Then, with 1:43 left in the fight, Alvarado knocked Prescott down with left and right uppercuts. Prescott was able to get up, but Alvarado came back with two hard rights sending Prescott to the ropes, and then landed 3 straight right uppercuts. Prescott was leaning forward, hanging onto Alvarado and not returning fire, prompting the referee to stop the fight with 1:07 left in the bout. Alvarado was down 87–84, 87–84, and 86–85 at the time of the stoppage, in what was a close fight.

Alvarado vs. Herrera
Alvarado's next fight was against a top light welterweight contender in Mauricio Herrera, at the Mandalay Bay Resort & Casino, also located in Las Vegas, Nevada. Herrera was coming off solid wins over Mike Dallas Jr. and Ruslan Provodnikov prior to his bout with Alvarado. Herrera started off well, successfully beating Alvarado to the punch, and slipping most of Alvarado's attack in the first round. In the 2nd round, Herrera decided to stand and trade with the bigger Alvarado, in a round where Alvarado controlled the pace and landed the harder punches. The pace would continue in the early and middle rounds, with Alvarado taking Herrera to the ropes and landing the harder punches, but with Herrera landing combinations of his own on Alvarado. By the later rounds, Alvarado had seized control, and began to tee off on Herrera, whose eye was completely closed by rounds 9 and 10. The fighters ended the fight in the 12th round, trading blows in the middle of the ring. Alvarado was awarded the clear unanimous decision win, with scores of 99–91, 97–93, and 96–94. After the fight, Alvarado said he wanted a big fight with Mexican Champion Juan Manuel Márquez, saying he's paid his dues and deserves a big fight at this point.

He was named to "The Gatti List" on The Fight Game with Jim Lampley on HBO in May 2012. The list consists of the Top 10 most entertaining fighters.

Alvarado vs. Ríos I & II
Coming in as two undefeated fighters, Alvarado faced Brandon Ríos on October 13, 2012, at the Home Depot Center in Carson, California. Alvarado was ahead on the scorecards up until the 6th round, in which Rios hurt him with a crushing right. Rios was able to stop him in the 7th as referee Pat Russell stopped the bout at 1:57 of the round. The fight was voted the 2012 Fight of the Year by Sports Illustrated.

A much anticipated rematch was held on March 30, 2013, at the Mandalay Bay in Las Vegas, Nevada. Like the first fight, both came in with a lot of fireworks as they continued to go toe to toe, until Alvarado changed strategy and became a lot more evasive and harder to hit with fancy footwork. Alvarado defeated Rios by unanimous decision with scores of 115–113, 115-113 and 114–113 to even up the victory score with Rios, each fighter at this point giving the other their first loss. Top Rank promoter Bob Arum dismissed another rematch and suggested to let the two boxers face other fighters first.

Alvarado vs. Provodnikov

Alvarado lost his WBO Light Welterweight title to Ruslan Provodnikov on October 19, 2013, at the 1stBank Center in Alvarado's hometown of Denver, Colorado. Provodnikov was ahead on all three scorecards and had knocked Alvarado down twice in the eighth round, when Alvarado elected not to come out for the eleventh round. Before the fight, Alvarado was elevated by the WBO to full title holder (as opposed to interim title holder), thus the fight against Provodnikov was his first defense of the full title.

Alvarado vs. Márquez
On May 17, 2014, at The Forum, in Inglewood, California, Alvarado was back in action in a welterweight bout against four-division champion and #6 ranked Ring Magazine pound for pound fighter: Juan Manuel "Dinamita" Márquez. The bout was contested for the WBO International Welterweight Championship. He lost the fight by unanimous decision.

Professional boxing record

See also
Notable boxing families

References

External links

American boxers of Mexican descent
Welterweight boxers
Boxers from Colorado
1980 births
Living people
American male boxers
World Boxing Organization champions
World light-welterweight boxing champions